Chichy  is a village in the administrative district of Gmina Małomice, within Żagań County, Lubusz Voivodeship, in western Poland.

The village has a population of 510.

References

Chichy